Michael Verhoeven (born 13 July 1938) is a German film director.

Life and work
Verhoeven is the son of the German film director Paul Verhoeven (not to be confused with the Dutch film director Paul Verhoeven). He married actress Senta Berger in 1966; their sons are actor-director Simon Verhoeven (born 1972) and actor Luca Verhoeven (born 1979). Together, the couple have a production company to make films. The 1970 anti-Vietnam War film, o.k. was entered into the 20th Berlin International Film Festival, but led to a scandal that forced the collapse of the festival without the awarding of any prizes.

In 1982, Verhoeven released Die weiße Rose (The White Rose), which, with the Best Foreign film nomination of Das schreckliche Mädchen (The Nasty Girl) in 1990, cemented his reputation as an important political contributor to German film. Along with his films  and documentary Der unbekannte Soldat (The Unknown Soldier), they have been hailed as an unstinting examination of Germany's Nazi period. In 1992, he was a member of the jury at the 42nd Berlin International Film Festival.

Awards
1990 Silver Bear for Best Director, 40th Berlin International Film Festival for The Nasty Girl
1995 Bavarian Film Awards, Best Production
2006 Bavarian Film Awards, Honorary Award

Selected filmography

Director
Film
The Dance of Death (1967) – based on The Dance of Death by August Strindberg
Up the Establishment (1969) – screenplay by Franz Geiger
Student of the Bedroom (1970) – screenplay by Volker Vogeler, based on a novel by 
o.k. (1970)
He Who Loves in a Glass House (1971)
 (1976)
 (1977) – screenplay by Elke Heidenreich and Bernd Schroeder
Sunday Children (1980) – based on a play by Gerlind Reinshagen
Die weiße Rose (1982)
 (1986)
The Nasty Girl (1990)
 (1995) – based on a story by George Tabori
 (2014) – based on an autobiographical novel by Laura Waco

Television
Der Kommissar: Dr. Meinhardts trauriges Ende (1970, TV series episode)
Tatort:  (1972, TV series episode)
Ein unheimlich starker Abgang (1973) – based on a play by Harald Sommer
 (1975, TV series)
Die Herausforderung (1975) – screenplay by Elke Heidenreich and Bernd Schroeder
Bier und Spiele (1977, TV series) – screenplay by Bernd Schroeder
Das Männerquartett (1978) – based on a novel by Leonhard Frank
1982: Gutenbach (1978) – screenplay by 
Verführungen (1979) – screenplay by Elke Heidenreich
Freundinnen: Edith und Marlene (1979, TV series episode) – screenplay by Elke Heidenreich and 
Die Ursache (1980) – based on a novella and a play by Leonhard Frank
Die Mutprobe (1982)
Das Tor zum Glück (1984)
Stinkwut (1986) – based on a play by 
Gundas Vater (1987)
Gegen die Regel (1987) – screenplay by Daniel Christoff
Ignaz Semmelweis – Arzt der Frauen (1988) – biographical film about Ignaz Semmelweis
Die schnelle Gerdi (1989, TV series)
Schlaraffenland (1990)
 (1992, TV series)
Eine unheilige Liebe (1993)
Zimmer mit Frühstück (2000) – screenplay by 
Enthüllung einer Ehe (2000) – screenplay with Nicole Walter-Lingen
Die schnelle Gerdi, second season (2004, TV series)
Tatort: Die Spieler (2005, TV series episode)
Bloch: Vergeben, nicht vergessen (2008, TV series episode)
Bloch: Heißkalte Seele (2012, TV series episode)
Bloch: Die Lavendelkönigin (2013, TV series episode)
 (2014) – based on a novel by 

Documentary and short films
Tische (1970)
Bonbons (1971)
Coiffeur (1973)
Liebe Melanie (1983) – film about Melanie Horeschowsky
Das Mädchen und die Stadt oder: Wie es wirklich war (1990)
The Legend of Mrs. Goldman and the Almighty God (1996) – with George Tabori
George Tabori – Theater ist Leben (1998) – film about George Tabori
Der Fall Liebl (2001)
Die kleine Schwester – Die weiße Rose: Ein Vermächtnis (2002)
Der unbekannte Soldat (The Unknown Soldier, 2006)
Menschliches Versagen (Human Failure, 2008)
The Second Execution of Romell Broom (2012)

Producer
 (dir. , 1983)
Welcome to Germany (dir. Simon Verhoeven, 2016)

Actor
 The Flying Classroom (1954), as Ferdinand
 Marianne of My Youth (1955), as Alexis
 The Crammer (1958), as Peter Wieland
 That's No Way to Land a Man (1959), as Horst Burkhardt
 The Juvenile Judge (1960), as Fred Kaiser
  (1960), as Richard Denger
 The House in Montevideo (1963), as Herbert
  (1964), as Karl Schultheiss
 Onkel Filser – Allerneueste Lausbubengeschichten (1966), as Karl Schultheiss
 Der Kommissar: Dr. Meinhardts trauriges Ende (1970, TV series episode), as Harro Vogt
 Der Kommissar: Kellner Windeck (1971, TV series episode), as Johannes Windeck

References

External links

1938 births
Filmmakers who won the Best Foreign Language Film BAFTA Award
German male film actors
Living people
Male actors from Berlin
Mass media people from Berlin
Members of the Academy of Arts, Berlin
Officers Crosses of the Order of Merit of the Federal Republic of Germany
Silver Bear for Best Director recipients